Tears of the Oracle is an original novel by Justin Richards  featuring the fictional archaeologist Bernice Summerfield. The New Adventures were a spin-off from the long-running British science fiction television series Doctor Who.

Synopsis
The shattered world of Dellah, once a thriving place of learning, has only one aspect of the university left. This is under siege by religious fanatics. Bernice Summerfield has to deal with this, a mad collector, her ex-husband and an Oracle that could lead to priceless information.

External links

The Cloister Library - Tears of the Oracle

1999 British novels
1999 science fiction novels
Virgin New Adventures
Novels by Justin Richards